() is a khum (commune) in Kaoh Andaet District, Takéo Province, Cambodia.

Administration 
As of 2019,  has 6 phums (villages) as follows.

References 

Communes of Takéo province
Kaoh Andaet District